Granada Gate was a city gate in the British Overseas Territory of Gibraltar. It was the main entry point by land to the old town of Gibraltar.

References

City gates in Gibraltar